Flize is a commune in the Ardennes department in northern France. On 1 January 2019, the former communes of Balaives-et-Butz, Boutancourt and Élan were merged into Flize.

Population

See also
Communes of the Ardennes department

References

Communes of Ardennes (department)
Communes nouvelles of Ardennes
Ardennes communes articles needing translation from French Wikipedia
Populated places established in the 11th century